"Find the 1st Prize" is the fifth episode of the fifth season of the South Korean anthology series Drama Stage, produced by Studio Dragon and C-JeS Entertainment for tvN. Directed by Park Hong-su and starring Kim Do-yoon, Ryu Hyun-kyung and Shin Dong-woo, this comedy is about a man, who escapes self-quarantined for COVID-19 to grab the biggest fortune of his life as he learns he has won the lottery with less than a day left before deadline of the payout. The episode was aired on tvN on June 17, 2022, at 12:10 (KST).

Synopsis
Kim Do-yoon seeking job as an aircraft pilot received a notice of indefinite postponement from the company ahead of the final interview. He is self-isolated due to COVID-19. As he learns that he won the first prize in the lottery
with less than a day left until the deadline for payment, he runs away to catch the greatest luck of his life. (As per official website)

Cast
 Kim Do-yoon as Jeong Jae-hoon 
 36 years old, with his wife Mi-ran's support, at a late age, he prepared for a job as an aircraft pilot but received a notice of indefinite postponement from the company ahead of the final interview.
 Ryu Hyun-kyung as Kang Mi-ran
 36 years old, Jeong Jae-hoon's wife, she majored in judo at university, after failing to be selected for the national team, she gave up sports.
 Lee Seo-hwan as Wang Jang-gyu
 33 years old, a strict loan shark who is sensitive to the interest payment date.
 CNU as Kim Hyeon-woo 
31 years old, after 5 years of  exam life, he passed the civil service examination.

Original soundtrack

Ratings

References

External links
 

2022 South Korean television episodes
Drama Stage